is a city located in Ōita Prefecture, Japan. The city was founded on April 1, 1951. As of March 31, 2017, the city has an estimated population of 18,341, with 8,384 households and a population density of 230 persons per km2. The total area is 79.48 km2.

Industry
West of the city is the Todaka Mine, one the biggest limestone quarries in Japan. The limestone is used in the Tsukumi cement plant owned by the Taiheiyo Cement Corporation.

Notable people from Tsukumi
Yasuei Yakushiji, former professional boxer

References

External links

 Tsukumi City official website 

Cities in Ōita Prefecture
Port settlements in Japan
Populated coastal places in Japan